Pio Gama Pinto (31 March 1927 – 24 February 1965) was a Kenyan journalist, politician and freedom fighter. He was a socialist leader who dedicated his life to the liberation of the Kenyan people and became independent Kenya's first martyr in 1965.

Early years
Pinto was born in Nairobi on 31 March 1927 to a Kenyan Asian family of Konkani Goan Catholic descent. Born to immigrant Goan parents hailing from the Indian Overseas Province of Goa, his father was an official in the colonial government of Kenya while his mother was a housewife. At age eight, he was sent to India for his education and spent the next nine years there, passing his matriculation exams at St. Joseph's High School, Arpora and then studying science at Karnatak College, Dharwar for two years before joining the Indian Air Force in 1944 as an apprentice ground engineer. He then took up a job in the Posts and Telegraph office in Bombay, participated in a general strike and became a founding member of the Goa National Congress whose aim was the liberation of Goa from Portuguese rule. When only seventeen, he started an agitation in Bombay against the Portuguese colonial occupation of Goa. His political activism soon made it necessary for him to return to Kenya to avoid being arrested and deported to the Tarrafal concentration camp in Cape Verde.

Political career
In 1949 Pinto returned to Kenya and, after a succession of clerical jobs, became involved in local politics aimed at overthrowing British colonial rule in Kenya. He turned to journalism and worked with the Colonial Times and the Daily Chronicle. In 1954, five months after his marriage to Emma Dias, he was rounded up in the notorious Operation Anvil and spent the next four years in detention on Manda Island. He was kept in confinement from early 1958 until October 1959 at Kabarnet.

In 1960 he founded the Kenya African National Union (KANU) newspaper Sauti Ya KANU, and later, Pan African Press, of which he subsequently became Director and Secretary.
Pinto played an active role in campaigning for KANU during the 1961 elections which it won. In 1963 he was elected a Member of the Central Legislative Assembly and in July 1964 was appointed a Specially Elected Member of the House of Representatives. He worked to establish the Lumumba Institute in 1964 to train KANU party officials.

Assassination
In Nairobi, on 24 February 1965, Pinto was shot at very close range in the driveway while waiting for the gate to open. He was with his daughter in his car at the time of his killing. The police set out to find three gunmen in connection with the murder. Kisilu Mutua and Chege Thuo, teenagers at the time, were arrested on the day of the murder. Kisilu and Chege informed the C.I.D. that they were hired by Ochola Mak’Anyengo, the secretary general of the Kenya Petroleum Oil workers union, to frighten Pinto ostensibly on account of his interfering with the union. Mak’Anyengo was arrested following these accusations. At the police lineup however, the accused affirmed that Ochola Mak’Anyengo resembled the man who hired them, but he was not the actual culprit who had identified himself as Mak'Anyengo. Ochola Mak’Anyengo was cleared of any involvement and released. After the case was heard in court, Thuo was acquitted, but Mutua was given the death sentence. This sentence was later reduced to life in prison following an appeal.

Pinto became the first Kenyan politician to be assassinated after Independence. At the time of his assassination, Pinto was 38. He was survived by his wife, Emma and his three daughters Linda, Malusha and Tereshka. Two years after the assassination, Emma and her daughters migrated to Canada. Different theories have been forwarded about the assassination with some suggesting that Pinto was killed by Jomo Kenyatta's men and others seeing Pinto's assassination as the extermination of an avowed Communist with links to the Mozambican liberation movement by neocolonial forces. An article published in Transition magazine in 1966 noted that a letter was circulated amongst Members of Parliament after Pinto's murder warning of the risks of cooperating with the eastern bloc. Bildad Kaggia was quoted saying that Pinto's killing was not an ordinary murder but a political one. Despite the wide perception that this was a political assassination, the police investigation treated the murder as not political.

When Mutua, convicted for the murder of Pinto, was released after 35 years in prison through a presidential pardon by the late President Daniel Arap Moi, Mutua insisted on his innocence and called for thorough investigations to identify Pinto's true assassins.

Posthumous commemoration
After his death, Pio Pinto's colleagues established a Pinto Trust Fund to help his widow and family to which leftist governments such as those of China and Tanzania contributed. In September 1965, Mrs. Emma Gama Pinto was invited to Santiago, Chile, to receive a posthumous prize awarded to her husband by the International Organisation of Journalists for his contribution in journalism to the liberation of African countries from foreign domination and exploitation. In 2008, Kenya released a series of four stamps titled Heroes of Kenya, one of which depicted Pinto.

References

Kenyan journalists
Assassinated Kenyan journalists
1927 births
1965 deaths
Assassinated Kenyan politicians
Deaths by firearm in Kenya
Kenya African National Union politicians
Kenyan people of Indian descent
Goan Catholics
People murdered in Kenya
Kenyan people of Goan descent
Kenyan Roman Catholics
Kenyan trade unionists
Kenyan politicians of Indian descent
Kenyan socialists